Floor Show was a Canadian music variety television series which aired on CBC Television in 1953.

Premise
Monty Hall, a Toronto radio broadcaster in the 1950s, made his television debut as Floor Show's host. The series featured dance band music of that time with visiting artists such as Bobby Gimby and Mart Kenney accompanied by their bands.

Production
Drew Crossan produced the series with CBC variety department chief Don Hudson as supervising producer. The set resembled a night club.

Scheduling
The half-hour series was broadcast Mondays at 9:00 p.m. (Eastern) from 22 June to 13 July 1953.

External links

 
 

CBC Television original programming
1950s Canadian variety television series
1953 Canadian television series debuts
1953 Canadian television series endings
Black-and-white Canadian television shows